Footsteps in the Dark is a light-hearted 1941 mystery film, starring Errol Flynn as an amateur detective investigating a murder.

Plot
Francis Warren (Errol Flynn) appears to have a normal life handling investments, but secretly he writes lurid detective novels under the pseudonym F.X. Pettijohn. His other career is unknown to wife Rita (Brenda Marshall) or to anyone but Inspector Mason (Alan Hale), who mocks the books, insisting that true crime is much more difficult to solve. A man named Leopold Fissue (Noel Madison) turns up, wanting Francis to help him turn uncut diamonds into cash. Otherwise, he will reveal Warren's other life to the public!
 
 
Fissue is then found murdered on a yacht. The trail leads Francis to burlesque dancer Blondie White (Lee Patrick), who becomes his prime suspect. But her dentist, Dr. Davis (Ralph Bellamy), gives her a solid alibi. Rita becomes sure that Francis is having an affair. Blondie turns up dead after asking Francis to retrieve a satchel from a locker. Rita thinks Francis must have killed Blondie, while her husband believes just the opposite to be true. The diamonds are in the suitcase. Francis concludes that only one man could be behind all this—Davis, the dentist, who promptly tries to kill Francis before the police can figure things out.

Cast
 Errol Flynn as Francis Monroe Warren II
 Brenda Marshall as Rita Warren
 Ralph Bellamy as Dr. R.L. Davis
 Alan Hale as Police Inspector Charles M. Mason
 Lee Patrick as Blondie White
 Allen Jenkins as Mr. Wilfred
 Lucile Watson as Mrs. Agatha Archer
 William Frawley as Detective 'Hoppy' Hopkins
 Roscoe Karns as Monahan
 Grant Mitchell as Wellington Carruthers
 Maris Wrixon as June Brewster
 Noel Madison as Leopold Fissue
 Jack La Rue as Ace Vernon
 Turhan Bey as Ahmed
 Robert Homans as Police Captain (uncredited)
 Olaf Hytten as Horace (uncredited)
 Frank Mayo as Joe (uncredited)
 Jack Mower as Police Sgt. Brent (uncredited)

Production

Original plays
The material was taken from two plays, Footsteps in the Dark (1935) and Blondie White originally titled Katzenzungen (1937)

Warner Bros bought the rights to Footsteps in the Dark in 1937.

Blondie White was about the adventures of Frank Warren, a writer of detective novels who gets involved in a real-life murder, along with his wife. It made its debut in London in 1937 starring Basil Sydney and Joan Marion. The Scotsman called it "a dexterous and ingenuously contrived little piece." Warner Bros bought the film rights in October, with a view to possibly filming it at their British base at Teddington Studios. (On the same trip Jack L. Warner also bought the rights to The Amazing Dr Clitterhouse and George and Margaret.)

Development
In December 1937 Warners announced they would make Blondie White as Footsteps in the Dark. Frank Cavett was assigned to write the script and Joan Blondell and Claude Rains were mentioned as possible stars.

John Huston and John Wexley were then reported as working on the script.

In late 1938, Edward G. Robinson was announced as star and Anatole Litvak director. Lya Lys was to be the female star and in May 1939 it was announced the film would still go ahead. But it did not happen and by November Norman Reilly Raine was still working on the script.

In July 1940, Lester Cole had taken over as writer and Robinson had to drop out due to a commitment to make The Sea Wolf. Cole says he was hired to rewrite Wexley's script, calling Wexley "a fine playwright and screenwriter" but the story "was hardly his style".

Errol Flynn had just done seven period films in a row and was pestering Warner's for a change of pace so he was cast instead of Robinson. Once Flynn came on board, Olivia de Havilland was announced as his co star. She was replaced by Brenda Marshall. William Keighley was the original director announced. Louella Parsons wrote the film would be "a humorously treated mystery yarn of The Thin Man variety".

Shooting
Filming started in October 1940.

Ralph Bellamy said Flynn was "a darling. Couldn't or wouldn't take himself seriously. And he drank like there was no tomorrow. Had a bum ticker from the malaria he'd picked up in Australia. Also a spot of TB. Tried to enlist but flunked his medical, so he drank some more. Knew he wouldn't live into old age. He really had a ball in Footsteps in the Dark. He was so glad to be out of swashbucklers."

Reception

Box office
The film was one of Flynn's less successful movies at the box office around this time.

Critical
Bosley Crowther of The New York Times wrote: "A few spots are faintly amusing, thanks to Allen Jenkins as a chauffeur-valet and William Frawley as a thick-headed cop. But most of it is painfully dull and obvious, the pace is incredibly slow and Mr. Flynn, playing the detective, acts like a puzzled schoolboy."

Variety wrote that Flynn did "well enough" but called the script "routine, going in for too much dialog and too many absurdities." Los Angeles Times wrote that "Errol Flynn becomes a modern for a change in a whodunit film and the excursion proves eminently worth-while... an exceptionally clever and amusing exhibit – a little lagging now and then in the action but nothing to bother about in that regard".

Film Daily reported: "Basis for a first-rate mystery meller with plenty of laughs is contained in the plot for this yarn, but the development of the script falls short of the story possibilities. The screenplay lacks any real punch drama and it does not have any hilariously amusing comedy, and it is also slightly incredible at times. On the whole, this picture is moderately entertaining screenfare for the average audience."

Harrison's Reports called the film "fairly good", though the killer's identity was "pretty obvious."

The Wall Street Journal called it "an amusing if not too subtle mystery."

John Mosher of The New Yorker wrote that while the burlesque performer added a "bright note", the film was otherwise a "commonplace mystery picture."

Filmink magazine argued Flynn was "not entirely comfortable as a comic actor but it's a very endearing performance, and he has that charisma and charm to compensate for his lack of technique. Unfortunately, the film doesn’t do its star justice."

Proposed sequel
John Wexley and Lester Cole were reported as working on a sequel, Ghosts Don't Leave Footprints. This was to reteam Marshall and Flynn and revolve around spiritualists. However no sequel materialized.

Other versions
The BBC made a TV adaptation of Blondie White called The Strange Case of Blondie White in 1947.

References

External links
 
 
 
 

1941 films
American black-and-white films
American films based on plays
Films directed by Lloyd Bacon
Films scored by Friedrich Hollaender
American comedy mystery films
Warner Bros. films
1940s comedy mystery films
1941 comedy films
1940s American films
1940s English-language films